Josiah Ogden Hoffman (April 14, 1766 – January 24, 1837) was an American lawyer and politician.

Early life
Josiah Ogden Hoffman was born on April 14, 1766, in Newark, New Jersey, the son of Nicholas Hoffman (1736–1800) and Sarah Ogden Hoffman (1742–1821). He studied law, was admitted to the bar, and practiced in New York City, and entered politics as a Federalist.

Career

Hoffman was a member of the New York State Assembly (New York Co.) in 1791, 1792, 1792–93, 1794, 1795. He was New York Attorney General from 1795 to 1802, and was also a member of the State Assembly in 1796–97.

On July 14, 1804, he was a pallbearer at the funeral of Alexander Hamilton.

From 1810 to 1811, he was Recorder of New York City; again a member of the State Assembly in 1812–13; and again Recorder of New York City from 1813 to 1815.

In 1828, he was appointed as one of the first justices (with Samuel Jones and Thomas J. Oakley) of the then established New York City Superior Court, and remained on the bench until his death in 1837.

Personal life
On February 16, 1789, he married Mary Colden (1770–1797), and they had four children, including:

 Alice Anna Hoffman (b. 1790)
 Sarah Matilda Hoffman (1791–1809), who was engaged to Washington Irving (1783–1859), who studied law at Hoffman's office, but did not wed because of her death before the marriage took place.
 Ogden Hoffman (1794–1856), a Congressman, who married Emily Burrall and later Virginia Southard.
 Mary Colden Hoffman (b. 1796)

He was a member of the New York Society Library, which has records of some of the books he borrowed between 1790 and 1805.

Following his first wife's death in 1797, on August 7, 1802, he married Maria Fenno (1781–1823), daughter of John Fenno (1751–1798), the Federalist editor of the Gazette of the United States. Maria's sister, Mary Eliza Fenno (d. 1817) married Gulian C. Verplanck. Together, Hoffman and Maria had three children, including:

 Charles Fenno Hoffman (1806–1884), the poet

Hoffman died on January 24, 1837, in New York City.

Descendants
His grandson was Ogden Hoffman, Jr. (1822–1891), a United States federal judge.

References
Notes

Sources
 Genealogy of the Hoffman Family by Eugene Augustus Hoffman (Dodd, Mead & Co., NYC; pg. 204ff)
 William Wickham Hoffman, Eleven generations of Hoffmans in New York; descendants of Martin Hoffman, 1657-1957 (New York: American Historical Co., 1957).
 Fenno-Hoffman family papers (1780-1883, bulk 1789-1845), Clements Library, University of Michigan, Ann Arbor.

1766 births
1837 deaths
Politicians from Newark, New Jersey
Members of the New York State Assembly
New York State Attorneys General
Josiah Ogden
New York City Recorders
Lawyers from Newark, New Jersey
19th-century American lawyers
People of colonial New Jersey